Mount Taragha (Terexe, ته‌ره‌غه‌) is a mountain  of the Zagros Mountains range, located in the Iranian Kurdistan region and northwestern Iran.

It is 20 km from the city of Bukan, near the  village of Nobar, in West Azerbaijan Province.

External links
 view of Mount Taragha

Mountains of Iran
Mountains of Kurdistan
Mount Taragha
Mount Taragha
Mountains of West Azerbaijan Province